The 2000 Wideyes Swedish Open was a men's tennis tournament played on outdoor clay courts in Båstad in Sweden and was part of the International Series of the 2000 ATP Tour. It was the 53rd edition of the tournament and ran from 10 July until 16 July 2000. First-seeded
Magnus Norman won the singles title.

Finals

Singles

 Magnus Norman defeated  Andreas Vinciguerra 6–1, 7–6(8–6)
 It was Norman's 3rd singles title of the year and the 10th of his career.

Doubles

 Nicklas Kulti /  Mikael Tillstrom defeated  Andrea Gaudenzi /  Diego Nargiso 4–6, 6–2, 6–3
 It was Kulti's 3rd title of the year and the 12th of his career. It was Tillstrom's 3rd title of the year and the 8th of his career.

References

External links
 ITF tournament edition details
 ATP tournament profile

Wideyes Swedish Open
Swedish Open
Swedish Open
July 2000 sports events in Europe
Swed